On Camera may refer to:
 On Camera (Canadian TV series), a dramatic anthology television series
 On Camera (Australian TV series), a variety series with music and comedy
 On Camera (album), a 1959 Patti Page album
 On Camera, a song by Gunna from the album Wunna